The Pretoria Muslim School (PMS) also now known as the Tshwane Muslim School is located in Laudium. The school's students at times have scored well in their exams.

References

Islamic schools in South Africa
Private schools in Gauteng
Educational institutions established in 1990
1990 establishments in South Africa